was an Ainu waka poet and evangelist.

Life 

Yaeko Batchelor was born on June 13, 1884, in Usu, Date City, Hokkaido. Her mother was named . Among Yaeko's five siblings was the Anglican pastor . Yaeko's father deeply trusted the Anglican missionary John Batchelor, and allowed Yaeko to be baptized. However, when Yaeko was 11, her father died. When she was 13, she set out for Sapporo to attend the Ainu Girls' School that Batchelor operated, and later advanced to St. Hilda's School in Tokyo.

In 1906, when Yaeko was 22, she was adopted by John Batchelor and his wife Louisa. January in 1909 Yaeko accompanied the pair on a trip to England, and was commissioned as a lay evangelist by the Archbishop of Canterbury. She pursued this mission in Biratori and Noboribetsu. In 1912, she went with her adopted father to Sakhalin to spread her faith there.

In 1931, a collection of her tanka poems entitled  was published. Her adoptive mother Louisa died in 1936, and was buried in Maruyama Cemetery in Sapporo. Her adoptive father John Batchelor died in 1944. Yaeko stored about 250 of his books and some of his other items in her home after his death.

Yaeko Batchelor died on 29 April 1962, in Kyoto while visiting there, at the age of 78.

References

Bibliography 
 

Japanese Ainu people
Japanese women poets
People from Date, Hokkaido
Japanese Anglicans
1884 births
1962 deaths
20th-century Japanese women writers
20th-century Japanese poets